Franc Abulnar (11 July 1909 – 18 November 1995) was a Yugoslav cyclist. He rode for Hermes Ljubljana. as the first Slovenian he competed at 1936 Tour de France and was second on Yugoslav National Road Race Championships in 1938.

References

External links
 Ekipa24

1909 births
Yugoslav male cyclists
Sportspeople from Ljubljana
Slovenian male cyclists
Year of death missing
Yugoslav emigrants to Canada
Slovenian emigrants to Canada